Piano Quintet Suite is the fifth leader album by Japanese pianist Junko Onishi, released on September 20, 1995 in Japan. 
It was released on March 19, 1996 by Blue Note Records.

Track listing

Personnel
Junko Onishi - Piano
Marcus Belgrave - Trumpet, Vocal
Eiichi Hayashi - Alto saxophone
Rodney Whitaker - Bass
Tony Rabeson - Drums

Production
Executive Producer - Hitoshi Namekata
Co-Producer - Junko Onishi
Recording and Mixing Engineer - Jim Anderson
Assistant Engineer - Yutaka Uematsu, Kensuke Miura
Mastering engineer - Yoshio Okazaki
Cover Photograph - Kunihiro Takuma
Inner Photograph - Fumiaki Fujimoto
Art director - Kaoru Taku
A&R - Yoshiko Tsuge

References

External links
Junko Onishi HP

1995 albums
Junko Onishi albums